Pashta is a common cantillation mark found in the Torah, Haftarah, and other books of the Hebrew Bible. It is part of the Katan group. Its mark symbol is identical to that of the Kadma.

While Kadma and Pashta use the same symbol, Pashta is distinct from Kadma in the placement of the symbol. Kadma is always placed on the accented syllable, while Pashta is placed on the last letter as well as on the accented syllable, if it's not the last.

The Hebrew word  translates into English as stretching out.

Occurrences
In the Katan group, the Pashta can be found either following a Mahpach, or with the Mahpach absent. Following the Pashta will either be a Munach-Zakef katan or just a Zakef katan.

The Pashta can also occur before the Segol group.

Numbers of occurrences

Melody

References

Cantillation marks